Exopheromone is a term coined by Terence McKenna, proposed in his book Food of the Gods for the controversial idea of chemical signals between members of different classes of living things, as opposed to among conspecifics. He suggested that certain chemicals produced in abundance in various hallucinogenic plants and fungi, such as dimethyltryptamine and psilocybin may act as pheromones produced by one kingdom (the vegetal) waiting for absorption by various others (for example, early primates or hominids). In this way a kind of ecological pheromonal system may be at work among biological kingdoms and ecosystems that have coevolved closely for long stretches of time. The term is not scientifically accepted.

Biology terminology